A guideline is a statement by which to determine a course of action. A guideline aims to streamline particular processes according to a set routine or sound practice. Guidelines may be issued by and used by any organization (governmental or private) to make the actions of its employees or divisions more predictable, and presumably of higher quality. A guideline is similar to a rule, but are legally less binding as justified deviations are possible.

List of guidelines
Examples of guidelines are:
 Code of practice
 EASE Guidelines for Authors and Translators of Scientific Articles
 Federal Sentencing Guidelines
 Guidelines for Examination in the European Patent Office
 Medical guidelines
 Publicly Available Specification
  Programming style guidelines
 UNGEGN Toponymic Guidelines

References

Government documents
Rules